Ghost of Honor is a 1957 American animation and comedy film directed by Izzy Sparber. The film features Casper the Friendly Ghost as well as additional music composed by Winston Sharples.

Plot

Cast
 Cecil Roy - Casper
 Mae Questel - Phone Operator, Painter (uncredited)
 Jackson Beck - TV Reporter, Cartoon Story Man, Cartoonist
 Jack Mercer - Cartoon Story Man, Artist
 Additional Voices are provided by Sid Raymond, Norma Macmillan and Gwen Davies

References

External links
 

1957 short films
1957 comedy films
American comedy short films
Casper the Friendly Ghost films
Films directed by Isadore Sparber
Paramount Pictures short films
American animated short films
American ghost films
1950s English-language films
Films about filmmaking
Self-reflexive films